The Edmundsons Electricity Corporation Limited was an electricity holding company that controlled and owned over 60 electricity undertakings throughout England and Wales. It was established in 1897 and was dissolved, despite its objections, as a consequence of the nationalisation of the British electricity supply industry in 1948.

History 
The Edmundsons Electricity Corporation Limited was founded in 1897. Its initial aim was to acquire and extend the business of Messrs. J. Edmundsons Company Limited of 19 Great George Street, Westminster. The latter was an electricity engineering company which, since 1888, had installed electricity systems in large buildings. The corporation raised capital of £200,000 in 1897 by the sale of shares. The capital was used to build generating stations and electricity supply systems (electricity undertakings) in Folkestone, Winchester, Salisbury, Ventnor and Shrewsbury. The corporation went on to acquire further electricity company franchises. For example:

 By 1908 Edmundsons had interests in nearly 50 local electricity supply undertakings.
 In 1923 the corporation had a controlling interest in the Cromer, Dorking, and the Frome undertakings.

In 1925 the Greater London and Counties Trust (GLCT) was established using American capital. The aim of the trust was to acquire financially weak electricity undertakings and to offer an economic supply using an electricity grid scheme. In 1928 the GLCT acquired 95 per cent of Edmundsons Corporation shares, which at that time directly or indirectly controlled 29 supply companies. 

In the 1930s the Edmondson Corporation consolidated and modernised its undertakings reducing them from 64 in 1932 to 23 in 1939.

Principal subsidiaries 
The corporation was based around the following geographical groups.

 The Shropshire, Worcestershire and Staffordshire Electric Power Company, which had undertakings at Dudley, Kidderminster, Smethwick and Stourport. The Shropshire company itself controlled:
 The South Wales Electric Power Distribution Company, which had undertakings at Llynfi and Upper Boat.
 The Urban Electric Supply Company Limited, which had undertakings at Berwick-upon-Tweed, Caterham, Dartmouth and Kingswear, Glossop, Godalming, Grantham, Hawick, Illogan, Newbury, Newton Abbot, Redruth, Stamford, and Walton and Weybridge. The Urban Electric Supply Company itself controlled:
 The East Anglian Electric Supply Company Limited, which had undertakings at Cromer and Southwold.
 The Cornwall Electric Power Company Limited, which had undertakings at Hayle and Carn Brea.
 The Western Electricity Supply Company Limited, which included the Stroud undertaking.
 The Wessex Electricity Company, which had undertakings at Amesbury, Andover, Chipping Norton, Downton, Frome, Lymington, Newbury and Yeovil.
 The Bedfordshire, Cambridgeshire and Huntingdonshire Electricity Company. For financial convenience Little Barford power station was constructed and financed by The ‘B.C.and H Power Station Company Limited. The power station was leased to the B.C. and H Company for 99 years to operate.

Growth 
At the general meeting of the corporation in July 1947 it was noted that the corporation had six main subsidiaries and owned 12 other companies and supplied an area of 15,000 square miles (38,850 km2) which was nearly a quarter of England and Wales.  The development of the organisation since 1932 was also analysed.

Nationalisation 
The Edmundson Corporation opposed nationalisation of the electricity industry. It claimed that state ownership would increase costs, become a burden on tax payer, and prevent consumer choice. It spent £70,000 on an advertising campaign to this effect.

The Edmundson Corporation was abolished on 31 March 1948 under the terms of the Electricity Act 1947 which nationalised the British electricity supply industry. The company's power stations and electricity transmission systems were vested in the British Electricity Authority. The local distribution systems and the electricity supply functions were vested in the various geographical Electricity Boards.

Corporation profits 
A summary of the financial profits of the corporation from 1905 to 1946 were as follows:

Key people

Company directors 
The inaugural directors of the corporation in 1897 were:

 John R. Wigham (Chairman)
 Francis E. Gripper (Managing Director)
 W. R. Davies
 Joshua W. Edmundson
 Walter B. Hopkins
 Henry Wigham

The registered office in 1897 was at 19 Great George Street, Westminster, London

The directors in 1935 were:

 Wade H. Hayes (Deputy Chairman)
 Lord Eltisley
 Lord Meston
 Sir Holberry Mensforth
 R. P. Sloan
 A. Winterbottom

By 1938 Sir Thomas Royden, later Lord Royden had been appointed as chairman, he remained chairman until nationalisation.  

In 1935 the registered office was at Thames House, Millbank, Westminster.

See also 

 List of pre-nationalisation UK electric power companies
 Timeline of the UK electricity supply industry
 List of power stations in England
 List of power stations in Wales

References 

Defunct electric power companies of the United Kingdom
Electric power companies of England
Electric power infrastructure in England
Energy companies disestablished in 1948